The Daily Californian (Daily Cal) is an independent, student-run newspaper that serves the University of California, Berkeley, campus and its surrounding community. It formerly published a print edition four days a week on Monday, Tuesday, Thursday, and Friday during the academic year, and twice a week during the summer. Since the beginning of the COVID-19 pandemic in California, however, The Daily Californian has been publishing a print newspaper once a week on Thursdays.

History 
The Daily Californian became independent from UC Berkeley in 1971 after the campus administration fired three senior editors over an editorial that encouraged readers to "take back" People's Park. Both sides came to an agreement, and The Daily Californian gained financial and editorial independence from the university and is now published by an independent corporation called the Independent Berkeley Students Publishing Company, Inc. The paper licenses its name from the Regents of the University of California.

On November 24, 1982, three days after the November 20th Big Game (now known for The Play), early morning readers of the Daily Cal were chagrined to find in the headline of the front page: "NCAA Awards Big Game to Stanford." Hundreds of copies of the Daily Cal with this fake headline had been strewn about campus in the wee hours. This was in fact a hoax perpetrated by aggrieved Stanford fans.

The Daily Californian has a history of publishing spirited editorials, and in some cases, editions containing controversial editorials have been subjected to newspaper theft. In 2002, Berkeley Mayor Tom Bates agreed to pay restitution after admitting to having thrown away a thousand copies of The Daily Californian after it endorsed his opponent, then-Mayor Shirley Dean. In May 2003, nearly 5,000 papers were stolen by students protesting coverage of the arrest of a Cal football player. The largest act of theft took place in November 1996 when the paper's senior editorial board endorsed Proposition 209. Nearly 23,000 papers were stolen on Election Day 1996, and in the following days, copies of the paper were tossed off the balcony of the newspaper's office and burned in effigy.

As a way to repair relations with campus community members angered by the publication of the editorial endorsing Proposition 209, editors at the Daily Cal established the nation's first regular college newspaper sex column. The column, now known colloquially as "Sex on Tuesday," led to college papers across the country to create similar sex columns.

On October 16, 2006, the Daily Cal launched its first blog, The Daily Clog, a student-life blog that accumulates various tidbits about Berkeley and college life.

On August 25, 2008, the Daily Cal announced that it would no longer print a paper version of the newspaper on Wednesdays amidst a decline in advertising revenues and higher newspaper costs.

The Daily Californian Alumni Association 
Many former Daily Cal staffers have joined The Daily Californian Alumni Association (DCAA) since its resurrection in August 1996. A unit of The Daily Californian Education Foundation, the DCAA provides mentorship and financial support to the current student staff.

Membership is open to all former staff members of The Daily Californian or student publications office staff (pre 1971). Reunions are held every October during homecoming weekend on the Berkeley campus.

Notable alumni 
 Adam Rapoport (1992) – Editor-in-Chief of Bon Appétit from 2010 to 2020
 Max Boot (1992) – Conservative columnist and author
Darrin Bell (1993) – Pulitzer Prize-winning editorial cartoonist for Washington Post Writers Group & King Features
 David Brock (1983) – Founder of Media Matters for America
 Warrington Colescott (1941–42) – Painter and printmaker
 John R. Emshwiller (1972) – Senior national correspondent for The Wall Street Journal
 Ron Fimrite (1949) – Humorist, historian, author and sportswriter, best known for his 34-year career as a journalist for Sports Illustrated
 Marguerite Higgins (1941) – Pulitzer Prize-winning war correspondent
 Karl Kasten (1938) – Award-winning Abstract Expressionist artist
 David Lazarus (1983) – Business and consumer columnist for the Los Angeles Times; previously, award-winning columnist for the San Francisco Chronicle
 T. Christian Miller (1992) – Pulitzer Prize-winning investigative reporter, author, and war correspondent working for ProPublica
 Johnathan A. Rodgers (1967) – CEO/president of TV One, former President of Discovery Networks and reporter for Sports Illustrated and Newsweek
 Michael Silver (1988) – NFL columnist for NFL.com; previously, award-winning NFL writer for Sports Illustrated, authoring the magazine's Super Bowl game story for 12 straight years from 1994 through 2006; co-author of books by Jerry Rice, Dennis Rodman, Kurt Warner, and Natalie Coughlin
 Henry T. Weinstein (1966) – Award-winning Los Angeles Times reporter
 Jann Wenner (1966) – Founder of Rolling Stone

See also 
 List of college newspapers
 Berkeley Political Review

References

External links 
 
 YouTube channel
 

University of California, Berkeley
Daily newspapers published in the San Francisco Bay Area
Publications established in 1871
Student newspapers published in California
Mass media in Berkeley, California
1871 establishments in California